Amir Ordacgi Caldeira (born 1950 in Rio de Janeiro) is a Brazilian physicist. He received his bachelor's degree in 1973 from the Pontifícia Universidade Católica do Rio de Janeiro, his M.Sc. degree in 1976 from the same university, and his Ph.D. in 1980 from University of Sussex. His Ph.D. advisor was the Physics Nobel Prize winner Anthony James Leggett. He joined the faculty at Universidade Estadual de Campinas (UNICAMP) in 1980. In 1984 he did post-doctoral work at the Kavli Institute for Theoretical Physics (KITP) at University of California, Santa Barbara and at the Thomas J. Watson Research Laboratory at IBM. In 1994–1995 he spent a sabbatical at the University of Illinois at Urbana-Champaign. He is currently a full professor at Universidade Estadual de Campinas. He was the recipient of the Wataghin Prize, from Universidade Estadual de Campinas, for his contributions to theoretical physics in 1986.

Caldeira's research interests are in theoretical condensed matter physics, in particular quantum dissipation and strongly correlated electron systems. His best known work is on the Caldeira-Leggett model, which is one of the first and most important treatments of decoherence in quantum mechanical systems.

Selected Scientific Articles

See also
 Cristiane de Morais Smith

References

1950 births
20th-century Brazilian physicists
Living people
Members of the Brazilian Academy of Sciences
Academic staff of the State University of Campinas
Theoretical physicists
Pontifical Catholic University of Rio de Janeiro alumni
Fellows of the American Physical Society